Anna Borysivna Fedorova (born February 27, 1990) is a Ukrainian concert pianist. Fedorova performs as soloist, chamber musician and with symphony orchestras in the major concert halls of the Netherlands, Germany, France, Italy, UK, Ukraine, Poland, the US, Mexico, Argentina, and parts of Asia. Fedorova is a David Young Piano Prize Holder supported by a Soiree d'Or Award and Keyboard Trust.

Early life
Fedorova was born in Kyiv, Ukrainian SSR. Both her mother, Tatiana Abayeva, and father, Boris Fedorov, were concert musicians, scholars, and teachers. From the time she was two years old, she had always wanted to become a pianist. She began playing at the age of five. She gave her first public recital when she was six, and she gave her national debut at the age of seven, at the National Philharmonic Society of Ukraine.

Regarding her early childhood, Fedorova has said that, with both parents being professional pianists, there was always "the sound of the piano in the house". Her parents gave her lessons, and she said "they were decisive for my musical development".

Education
In 2008, Fedorova graduated from the Lysenko Musical College for gifted children. As a student, she was the recipient of The President of the Ukraine Scholarship during 2003–2008.

Outside her native Ukraine, Fedorova studied under Leonid Margarius at The International Piano Academy, which is a school of advanced piano performance specialization located in Imola, Italy.

Fedorova also studied at the Royal College of Music in London under Norma Fisher. She was a recipient of the Big Give full tuition scholarship.

She has also received artistic guidance from world-renowned pianists such as Alfred Brendel, Menahem Pressler, and András Schiff.

Career
Fedorova's "international concert career took off while she was only a child".

In 2013, at the age of twenty-three, Anna performed at Concertgebouw in Amsterdam, Netherlands. She played Rachmaninoff's Piano Concerto No 2. Fedorova has performed there more than thirty times.

Fedorova's manager Rob Groen recounted the first time he heard her play. He "reluctantly" heard her play "as part of a group of piano students performing for him in Kyiv". The first three were "all very good", but, when he heard Anna, he was "in shock" by her "exceptional talent".

Musical critics have praised Fedorova's signature "sweet modesty and wild expression", which rendered listeners "completely taken by surprise, compelled and astonished". Fedorova says about her playing, "You can really paint with music. You see the colorful, inspiring scenes."

Music festivals and competitions

Fedorova has appeared at numerous International Music Festivals and has claimed top prizes in Italy, Greece, Germany, Slovakia, Estonia, and the Czech Republic. Music festivals in which she has appeared include:
Annecy Classic Musical Festival in Annecy, France.
Aurora Music Festival in Stockholm.
Festival of Auvers-sur-Oise in Auvers-sur-Oise, France.
The Chopin Festival in Antonin, Poland.
The Corfu Festival of Arts in Corfu, Greece.
The first International Chamber Music Festival held in the Edesche Concert Hall in Ede, Netherlands. The festival ran from May 25 to May 28, 2017. Fedorova was one of the performers as well as the artistic director. Previously, she had often performed in Ede, and she was the artist in residence in the 2015–2016 season. As artistic leader, Fedorova will be the central musician of the ICFEde, "a starting intercultural Christian community in the municipality of Ede".
The Festival Internacional de Música Clássica de João Pessoa in João Pessoa, Brazil. After her 2014 concerts in Brazil, Fedorova said, "it was special to experience how the people react to my music, I could see in their eyes how curious and excited they were."
The Frederick Chopin Competition in Narva, Estonia, in 2004, at which Fedorova won first prize.
The Gstaad Menuhin Festival in Gstaad, Switzerland.
The Institute of Frederick Chopin at the Fourth Moscow International Frederick Chopin Competition for Young Pianists in Moscow. Fedorova won the Second Prize and a Special Prize in 2004.
The International Keyboard Institute & Festival (IKIF) in New York City. In 2006, 2007 and 2008, Fedorova won the Dorothy MacKenzie Artist Recognition Scholarship Award.
The International Piano Festival in Trieste, Italy.
The International Rubinstein 'In Memoriam' piano competition in Bydgoszcz, Poland, in 2009 at which Fedorova won First Prize.
The Lyon Piano Competition in Lyon, France, in 2012 at which Fedorova won a third prize and the Audience Award.
The Musikdorf Ernen in Ernen, Switzerland.
The Orpheum Music Festival in Zurich.
The Ravinia Festival in Highland Park, Illinois.
The Rubinstein Piano Festival in Lodz, Poland. Fedorova took First Prize in 2009. In 2011, Fedorova played F. Chopin's Two Nocturnes Op. 27; Valse in A Flat Major, Op. 42 with the Orchestra Polish Camerata, conducted by Marek Glowacki.
The Tbilisi International Young Pianists competition in Tbilisi, Georgia, in 2005 where she won First Prize and a Special Prize as Best Pianist in the Competition.
The Verbier Festival Academy in Verbier, Switzerland, at which Fedorova became a recipient of the Verbier Festival Academy Award. Fedorova is one of the Academy's Musicians for 2017.
 Violon sur la sable Festival.

Orchestras with which Fedorova has performed
Fedorova has performed with orchestras around the world including:
The Philharmonia Orchestra in London, UK/>
The Utah Symphony Utah, USA/>
The BBC Symphony London, UK/>
The Dallas Symphony Orchestra in Dallas, Texas.
The Verbier Festival Orchestra Verbier, Switzerland/>
The Hong Kong Philharmonic Orchestra under the baton of Jaap van Zweden in Hong Kong. On April 15–16, 2016, Fedorova played Rachmaninov's Piano Concerto no. 2 with the orchestra conducted by Jun Märkl.
The Kyoto Symphony Orchestra in Kyoto, Japan.
The Krakow Philharmonic Orchestra in Krakow, Poland.
The Orquesta Filarmónica de Buenos Aires in Buenos Aires, Argentina.
The Orchestre de Chambre de Lausanne in Lausanne, Switzerland.
The Residentie Orkest and the Camerata in Amsterdam, the Netherlands.
The Residentie Orchestra in the Hague, the Netherlands.
The Tokyo New City Orchestra in Japan.
The Philharmonia of the Nations in Germany.
The Nordwestdeutsche Philharmonie in Germany.
The Orquesta Sinfonica Nacional de Mexico in Mexico.
The Netherlands Philharmonic Orchestra in the Netherlands.
The Bournemouth Symphony Orchestra in the Bournemouth Pavilion in Bournemouth, England. After Fedorova's 2016 concert, Jade Grassby, the multimedia reporter for the Bournemouth Echo wrote that the limelight moved "temporarily away from the orchestra and onto" Fedorova, as she played Rachmaninoff's Piano Concerto Number 2. She "delivered a beautiful performance, combining delicacy and passion in every phrase".
The Nordwestdeutsche Philharmonie in Herford, Germany.
The Orchestre de Chambre de Lausanne in the Netherlands.
The Orquesta Filarmónica de la UNAM OFUNAM in Mexico City, Mexico.
Buenos Aires Philharmonic Orchestra (Orquestra Filarmonica de Buenos Aires) in Buenos Aires, Argentina.
The Orquesta Sinfonica Nacional de Mexico in Mexico.
The Nottingham Philharmonic Orchestra in a 2016 concert at Albert Hall in London. About the concert, William Ruff, music critic for the Nottingham Post wrote "Soloist Anna Fedorova relished the work's sophistication and opportunities for bravura display. The opening movement exploded in a fireburst of energy and its castanet-accompanied march was handled with wittily pointed humour. Her characterisation of each of the slow movement's variations was sharply perceptive—and her high-octane handling of the finale was another display of pianistic fireworks." William Ruff, Nottingham Post (October 16, 2016) about Anna Fedorova's performance with the Nottingham Philharmonic Orchestra's concert at Albert Hall.
The Polish Camerata in Lodz, Poland.
The Royal Philharmonic Orchestra in London.
The Yomiuri Nippon Symphony Orchestra.
The Xalapa Symphony Orchestra in Mexico.
The Boston Philharmonic Youth Orchestra at Symphony Hall in Boston and on a two and a half week tour across eight cities in Brazil.
The Ukrainian Freedom Orchestra from its inauguration in 2022.

Concert halls

Fedorova has given concerts in concert halls across Europe, North America, South America, and Asia. These include:
Carnegie Hall in New York City.
Royal Albert Hall in the PROMS, London, UK
Elbphilharmonie in Hamburg, Germany
Isarphilharmonie in Munich, Germany
Konzerthaus in Berlin, Germany
Cadogan Hall in the Royal Borough of Kensington and Chelsea, London.
The Concertgebouw in Amsterdam in the Netherlands.
In September 2013, in the Concertgebouw, Fedorova performed Rachmaninoff's 2nd Piano Concerto to open the season of Sunday Morning Concerts. The recording of this concert has received over thirty-five million views on YouTube.
Fedorova performed in the Concertgebouw in December 2010 to a full house of 1,974 seats in the Grote Zaal (Main Hall). After her concert, Christo Lelie, a Dutch writer and musician, wrote a review in the Trouw. The story was headlined "Anna Fedorova Deserves a Full House at the Concertgebouw." He explained that at nineteen years of age, Fedorova was "one of the major piano talents of today". Her playing was characterized as "a solid technique, a tone that is powerful but not harsh, impeccable rhythm, and an adept feel for a composition's form". Fedorova's deeply personal performance "touched the hearts of her audience".
In November 2015, Fedorova returned to the Royal Concertgebouw to perform Rachmaninoff's Piano Concerto No 3. This performance was again streamed live on TV, internet and radio.
The Cultural Centre of Belém in Lisbon, Portugal.
The Edesche Concert Hall in Ede, Netherlands. On February 18, 2017, Fedorova and members of the Royal Concertgebouw Orchestra performed Chopin's Second Piano Concerto No. 2 in F minor, op. 21.
Fuller Lodge Art Center in Los Alamos, New Mexico.
On June 28, 2009, Anna Fedorova gave a masterpianist recital at the Fuller Lodge Art Center in Los Alamos, New Mexico. On July 11, 2009, her father Boris Fedorov performed in the same venue. As part of the program, his daughter joined him on stage for a piece requiring three pianists, one of whom was Anna. It was the first time that the father and daughter had been on stage together for a major performance.
The Kraków Philharmonic Concert Hall in Kraków, Poland.
The La Sala Verdi di Milano in Milan, Italy.
The Laeiszhalle in Hamburg, Germany.
The Louis Vuitton Foundation in Paris, France, where in March 2017 Fedorova gave a Chopin recital.
The Morton H. Meyerson Symphony Center in Dallas, Texas.
The Palacio de Bellas Artes in Mexico City, Mexico.
The People's House of Culture Trollhattan in Trollhattan, Sweden.
Peoples' Symphony Concerts in New York City.
The Gdansk Philharmonic in Gdańsk, Poland.
The Prima La Musica Vincennes, France where Fedorova made her French debut.
The Sala Neza in Mexico City, Mexico.
The Teatro Colón in Buenos Aires, Argentina.
The Tel Aviv Museum of Art in Tel Aviv, Israel.
The Théâtre des Champs-Élysées in Paris, France where Fedorova gave a concert with the Orchestre Lamoureux on January 22, 2017, and gave a Chopin Recital on March 3, 2017.
The Prima La Musica, where on June 30, 2017, Fedorova gave a concert with three of her Chamber Music friends: Eldbjørg Hemsing, violin; Benedict Kloeckner, cello and Nicolas Schwarz, double bass.
The Tokyo Bunka Kaikan in Tokyo.
The Warsaw Philharmonic Concert Hall–Polish National Concert Hall in Warsaw, Poland.
The Zurich Tonhalle in Zurich.

Conductors with whom Fedorova has performed
Conductors with whom Fedorova has performed include:

Gianandrea Noseda, principal conductor of the National Symphony Orchestra />
Jaap van Zweden, music director of the Dallas Symphony Orchestra (2008–2018) and music director of the Hong Kong Philharmonic Orchestra and others.
Van Zweden said, "performing Beethoven's 5th Piano Concerto with Anna Fedorova" was "a great pleasure for me, the orchestra, and the audience. Anna is a wonderful artist, a great pianist and a very charming charismatic person".
Gerard Oskamp, who was originally a trained cellist and then later became a conductor. He began his career as a cellist in the Rotterdam Philharmonic Orchestra where he remained for three years. He then studied conducting with Edo de Waart, Hans Swarowsky and Ferdinand Leitner and began his conducting career in 1976. His performance with Anna Fedorova was of Rachmaninoff's 3rd Piano Concerto.
Olari Elts, principal guest conductor of the Estonian National Symphony Orchestra.
Alun Francis, currently principal conductor and artistic director of the 'Orquesta Filarmónica de la UNAM' (OFUNAM) in Mexico City.
Justus Frantz, the chief conductor of the Philharmonia of the Nations.
Howard Griffiths, director general of the Brandenburg State Orchestra.
Kevin Griffiths, artistic director and chief conductor of the Collegium Musicum Basel.
Shin-ik Hahm or Shinik Hahm, conductor of the Philharmonia Orchestra of Yale University.
David Lockington, music director of the Pasadena Symphony.
Jun Märkl, a guest conductor with the world's leading orchestras.
Martin Panteleev, who was music director of the Sofia Philharmonic, Bulgaria, until he was fired in 2016.
Alejo Perez, who serves as guest conductor of orchestras worldwide.
Carlos Miguel Prieto, music director of the Louisiana Philharmonic Orchestra.
Bartholomeus-Henri Van de Velde, who coaches young students and serves as director-consultant of the Bruno Lussato Institute.

Videos
YouTube videos featuring Fedorova include:
Rachmaninoff: Piano Concerto no.2 op.18. over 37 million views. Performed on September 1, 2013, at the Royal Concertgebouw, Amsterdam, the Netherlands the Nordwestdeutsche Philharmonie led by Martin Panteleev.
Mozart, Chopin, Schumann and Rachmaninoff. Performed on December 8, 2016 at a Mystery Concert with a Mystery Guest in The Royal Concertgebouw in Amsterdam, Netherlands.
Rachmaninoff, Piano concerto No. 3. Performed with the Nordwestdeutsche Philharmonie.
Anna Fedorova: Interview.
Ravel, Gaspard de la Nuit. Performed at the Annecy Classic Festival in August 2014.
Chopin, Sonata No. 3, Part I, Chopin, Sonata No. 3, Part II, Chopin, Sonata No. 3, Part III, and Chopin, Sonata No. 3, Part IV. Performed at the Rubinstein Piano Festival in Lodz, Poland, in the Lodz Filharmonia.
Mozart, Sonata B flat Major, K333. Performed in August 2014 at the Annecy Classic Musical Festival in Annecy, France.
Chopin sonata in G minor Op 65 with Benedict Kloeckner playing the Cello. Performed at Koblenz, January 2014.
F. Chopin, Etude Op. 25, No. 11. Recorded in the Piano House in Kościuszki, Poland.
Mozart, Piano Concerto No. 21 K 467 - Allegro. Performed September 2011 with the Orchestre de Chambre de Lausanne conducted by Howard Griffiths in the Tonhalle, Zürich.
Beethoven, Piano Sonata No. 23 - mvt. 1.
Rachmaninoff, Prelude Op. 23, No. 1 in F-sharp minor.
Franz Liszt, Petrarch Sonnet 104.
Franz Liszt, Hungarian Rhapsody No. 6.
Rachmaninoff, Prelude op. 32 no 12 in G sharp minor.
Rachmaninoff/Volodos, Italian Polka.
Sandra Lied Haga and Anna Fedorova, Rachmaninoff Cello Sonata Rachmaninoff Cello Sonata, 3. Performed on September 25, 2016.
In an interview on December 23, 2014, Fedorova said, "I try to learn everything about the composer." For example, she said that Rachmaninov was depressed when composed his Cello sonata; it was a difficult time for him. So, although "the sonata is full of hope and happiness", one also hears "concern and doubt. The piece also has dark sides." She said, "with this knowledge, I try to penetrate deeper into the core of the music."
Three pieces by the Oyster Duo, a pair of two musicians: Anna Fedorova, piano and Nicolas Schwarz. The Oyster Duo gave a concert at the London School of Economics and Political Science on November 10, 2016.
Oyster Duo: Schumann Fantasiestücke, Op. 73.
Oyster Duo: Bottesini Tarantella.
Oyster Duo: Gershwin Prelude No. 2.
Rachmaninoff/Volodos, Italian Polka.

Recordings
In 2014, Fedorova's first live recital CD was released under the DiscAnnecy label. It contains works by Brahms, Liszt and Chopin.
Also in 2014, Champs Hill Records released a recording of a recital given by Fedorova and Jamal Aliyev. The CD is titled Russian Masters.
In 2015, Piano Classics released an audio CD of Fedorova playing Rachmaninoff's Piano Concerto No. 2 and Cello Sonata with Benedict Kloeckner as cellist, accompanied by the Nordwestdeutsche Philharmonie.
In 2015, Disc Auvers released a disc titled Anna Fedorova, Piano: Chopin, Listz, Brahms with Fedorova playing works by Chopin, Liszt, and Brahms. The disc includes Chopin's Piano Sonata No. 3, Listz's Années de pèlerinage, Deuxième année: Sonetto del Petrarcha No. 104, and Brahms' Six Piano Pieces, op. 118.
In his review in Fanfare on July 10, 2016, Colin Clarke wrote, "The Chopin Sonata (with exposition repeat) reveals a player of the highest sensitivity... Fedorova has the daring to let bare textures speak for themselves; her rests are always impeccably timed and her approach reminds the listener of the modernity of Chopin's writing." "Brahms seems to enter a whole new world, a fantastical new beginning almost. Fedorova conveys all the exploratory wonder; the end is rapt and magnificent". In the Liszt piece, Fedorova gives "another fine performance". She "seems to enter straight into the world of the composer. Her way with the long tenor/bass melodies expertly tells a story; her filigree is impeccably Lisztian."
In the same issue of Fanfare, Peter J. Rabinowitz had a review. In it he said, "Now just reaching her mid 20s, Ukrainian pianist Anna Fedorova shows herself, on this debut recital, to be a significant pianistic talent." In the Chopin piece, she plays "with a seamless legato, a rich and deep tone, a flexible (even improvisatory) sense of pulse, a sure feel for the emotional weight of the harmonies, and an enviable ability to sustain the phrases, she brings out the long lines in a way that's rare for hotshots of her generation". "She produces instead a polished elegance that helps explain why she did so well in the International Rubinstein In Memoriam competition in Poland in 2009." In the Brahms piece, Fedorova's playing is "even more succulent". "Her treatment of dynamics, especially at the quiet end, draws you in." "This is a distinguished reading—as is her rich and flexible reading of the Liszt Sonnetto."
In 2016, more albums by Fedorova were released on DRC: Rachmaninov's Piano Concerto No 3 and Mussorgsky's Pictures at an Exhibition were released. Piano Classics released an album of Fedorova playing Rachmaninoff's Piano Concerto No. 2, Cello Sonata accompanied by the Nordwestdeutsche Philharmonic.

References

External links

Anna Fedorova's Management France Benelux
Anna Fedorova: Biography

1990 births
Living people
Ukrainian classical pianists
Ukrainian women pianists
Ukrainian women musicians
Musicians from Kyiv
21st-century classical pianists
Women classical pianists
21st-century women pianists